Lentomitella unipretoriae is a fungus that was named after the University of Pretoria. This discovery makes the University of Pretoria the first university in the world with a fungus named after it.

Latin diagnosis

References

Sordariomycetes enigmatic taxa